Lee Kilday (born 4 February 1992) is a Scottish professional footballer who plays as a defender for Queen's Park. Kilday has previously played for Hamilton Academical, Greenock Morton and Queen of the South.

Career

Hamilton Academical
Kilday made his senior debut for Hamilton Academical in the Scottish Premier League on 15 January 2011, in a 4–0 defeat versus Rangers at Ibrox. The performance of Kilday and other young players in that match, including Michael Devlin, who also made his debut, was praised by manager Billy Reid.

In March 2012, Kilday signed a contract with the Accies until May 2014. In May 2012, Kilday announced his intention to become a first-team regular at the Accies during the 2012–13 season.

In October 2012, Kilday was sent out on loan to Stenhousemuir.

In May 2014, Kilday was released by the Accies.

Greenock Morton
In June 2014, Kilday signed for Greenock Morton and was offered a one-year contract extension, after playing all 36 league matches for the Ton.

Following another successful season, Kilday signed a further two-year contract with the Greenock club and rejected a deal to return to the Accies. In August 2016, Kilday was appointed Ton's club captain at the age of twenty four.

In March 2018, to help aid his recovery from a long-term injury, Kilday was loaned out to Airdrieonians on an emergency loan deal. In June 2018, Kilday signed a one-year extension with the Ton.

Queen of the South
On 2 July 2019, Kilday signed a one-year contract with Dumfries club Queen of the South.

Queen's Park

On 16 July 2020, Kilday signed for Queen's Park after leaving the Doonhamers.

Honours
Morton
Scottish League One: Winners 2014–15

Career statistics

External links

References

1992 births
Airdrieonians F.C. players
Association football defenders
Greenock Morton F.C. players
Hamilton Academical F.C. players
Living people
Scottish Football League players
Scottish footballers
Scottish Premier League players
Scottish Professional Football League players
Footballers from Glasgow
Stenhousemuir F.C. players
Queen of the South F.C. players
Queen's Park F.C. players